Brian Kerr is a former Canadian politician, who served as a BC Liberal Member of the Legislative Assembly of British Columbia from 2001 to 2005, representing the riding of Malahat-Juan de Fuca.

External links
Brian Kerr

British Columbia Liberal Party MLAs
1945 births
Living people
21st-century Canadian politicians